Lion Capital LLP is a British private equity firm specialising in investments in the consumer sector.  Previous and current consumer brands owned by Lion have included Weetabix, Jimmy Choo, Wagamama, Kettle Foods and AllSaints.

The firm is headquartered in London, England, and employs 30 investment executives across its London and Los Angeles offices.

The firm’s principals have invested approximately €6 billion in more than 30 businesses and more than 100 consumer brands.

History

The firm’s predecessor was launched in 1998 as the European affiliate of American private equity firm Hicks Muse Tate & Furst (now HM Capital). Lyndon Lea and Robert Darwent separated the European affiliate from its ailing American parent, launching Lion Capital as an independent private equity firm. Lion Capital was founded in 2004 by Lyndon Lea, Robert Darwent and Neil Richardson with the goal of creating the leading investment firm focused on the consumer sector. In 2004, Lion Capital completed fundraising for its first private equity fund, Lion Capital Fund I, with commitments from institutional investors of €820 million.  Over thirty institutions committed capital to Fund I.

In April 2007, Lion Capital established a North American presence, opening an office in New York. That same year, Lion Capital raised its second private equity fund, Lion Capital Fund II, with approximately €2.0 billion of investor commitments.

In 2010, Lion Capital formed its third private equity fund, Lion Capital Fund III, which ultimately included capital commitments of €1.5 billion.

In October 2012, the North American office was relocated from New York to Los Angeles.

In May 2016, it was announced that Javier Ferrán will replace Franz Humer as Chairman of Diageo as of 1 January 2017 In November 2018, Lion Capital and Serruya Private Equity teamed up to acquire the Global Franchise Group (Great American Cookies, Round Table Pizza, Marble Slab Creamery, Pretzelmaker, MaggieMoo's Ice Cream and Treatery, and Hot Dog on a Stick) from Levine Leichtman Capital Partners. In February 2019, Lion Capital acquired the DMC Group (needlecrafts manufacturers DMC, Wool and the Gang, Sirdar, Tilsatec) from BlueGem Capital. During the summer of 2019, Lion Capital reduced its participation in Authentic Brands Group to make room for BlackRock's  majority-shareholding move.

Activities 

Lion Capital seeks to invest in mid and large-sized companies selling branded products, including apparel, accessories and luxury goods, food distribution and specialty retail.  Lion Capital’s directors have resisted diversification into other sectors, claiming that their strategy is to know more about less.

Lion Capital’s team draws on its investing and operating expertise to identify consumer brands with growth potential and implement value creating strategies within these businesses, often through geographic expansion, category extension, product innovation or operating improvements. Lion Capital focuses on companies in Europe and North America.

On June 26, 2019,  Chloe Sorvino, a reporter from Forbes magazine, reported that Lion Capital will invest $ 100 million in Gordon Ramsay Holdings Limited, to open 100 restaurants in the United States by the year 2024.

Lion Capital's portfolio has included some of the world's best known consumer brands:

See also
Lyndon Lea
Hicks Muse Tate & Furst

References

External links
 

Private equity firms of the United Kingdom
Financial services companies established in 2004
Financial services companies based in London